The American Comedy Network was a group of former radio deejays that served as a radio syndication service that provided comedy material in the form of parody and novelty songs to local U.S. and Canadian radio stations.  The group was founded by Andy Goodman, The Real Bob James, Dale Reeves, David Lawrence, and Mechele George .  Bob Rivers contributed song parodies to the group. The group officially ended in February of 2013.

One of the first songs produced by the group was "Breaking Up Is Hard On You (a/k/a Don't Take Ma Bell Away from Me)", about the lawsuit and the resulting Bell System divestiture, the court ordered split up of U.S. telecommunications company AT&T's Bell System, which also contains a spoken word comedy bit at the end.  The song was a parody of Neil Sedaka's #1, 1962 hit "Breaking Up Is Hard to Do".  It reached #70 on the Billboard Hot 100 chart and spent five weeks on the chart in early 1984. This was the only song by the group to ever make the chart and also the only single ever released by the American Comedy Network.

References

All Access: American Comedy Network Closes

1984 establishments in the United States
Musical groups established in 1984
American comedy musical groups
2013 disestablishments in the United States